Edmund Robinson was an English ten-year-old boy from Wheatley Lane, Lancashire, who sparked a witch-hunt.

His story was the inspiration for the 1634 play The Late Lancashire Witches.

References
#

Notes

Year of birth missing
Year of death missing
17th-century English people
English children